Live! An Evening With Crystal Gayle is a recording of a 2005 concert by Crystal Gayle at the Renaissance Center in Dickson, Tennessee. Originally released in a package containing a DVD and an edited CD, it was Gayle's first official live album and includes some of her biggest hits of the 1970s and 1980s, as well as several otherwise unreleased songs. It also includes Gayle singing some songs by her sister, Country music singer Loretta Lynn, like "Coal Miner's Daughter" (performed with her sister Peggy Sue). The DVD has various extra features, including an interview with Gayle and a photo gallery.

It was released on August 29, 2006 on Cleopatra Records.

The DVD has since been reissued by numerous different labels and though featuring identical content, has confusingly been given different titles, e.g. Live in Tennessee, Don't It Make My Brown Eyes Blue, Crystal Gayle Live and Crystal Gayle: Live in Concert (not to be confused with Crystal Gayle in Concert).

Track listing 
"Everybody's Reaching Out for Someone"
"Green Door"
"Half the Way"
"Wrong Road Again"
"Somebody Loves You"
"Why Have You Left the One You Left Me For"
"Talking in Your Sleep"
"You Don't Even Know My Name"
"Old Songs" (with Jay Patten)
"Coal Miner's Daughter" (with Peggy Sue)
"Blue Moon of Kentucky" (with Peggy Sue)
"Ready for the Times to Get Better"
"Midnight in the Desert"
"More Money" (with Peggy Sue)
"Don't Come Home A' Drinkin' (With Lovin' on Your Mind)" (with Peggy Sue)
"That's What I Like About the South"
"Don't It Make My Brown Eyes Blue"
"I Saw the Light"
"Somebody Touched Me"
"I'll Fly Away"
"Jesus on the Mainline"
"When I Dream"

Crystal Gayle albums
2006 live albums